The 2022 Georgia Southern Eagles softball team represented Georgia Southern University during the 2022 NCAA Division I softball season. The Eagles played their home games at Eagle Field at GS Softball Complex. The Eagles were led by first-year head coach Sharon Perkins and were members of the Sun Belt Conference.

Preseason

Sun Belt Conference Coaches Poll
The Sun Belt Conference Coaches Poll was released on January 31, 2022. Georgia Southern was picked to finish eighth in the conference with 32 votes.

Preseason All-Sun Belt team

Olivia Lackie (USA, Pitcher)
Leanna Johnson (TROY, Pitcher)
Kandra Lamb (LA, Pitcher)
Jessica Mullins (TXST, Pitcher)
Kamdyn Kvistad (USA, Catcher)
Sophie Piskos (LA, Catcher)
Faith Shirley (GASO, 1st Base)
Kelly Horne (TROY, 2nd Base)
Daisy Hess (GSU, Shortstop)
Sara Vanderford (TXST, 3rd Base)
Iyanla De Jesus (CCU, Designated Player)
Raina O'Neal (LA, Outfielder)
Mackenzie Brasher (USA, Outfielder)
Emily Brown (GSU, Outfielder)
Jade Sinness (TROY, Outfielder)

|}

National Softball Signing Day

Personnel

Schedule and results

Schedule Source:
*Rankings are based on the team's current ranking in the NFCA/USA Softball poll.

References

Georgia Southern
Georgia Southern Eagles softball
Georgia Southern Eagles softball seasons